Xanthoparmelia lecanorica is a foliose lichen that belongs to the genus Xanthoparmelia. It is noted for being similar in appearance and has often been misidentified as Xanthoparmelia arida.

Description 
Xanthoparmelia lecanorica grows to around 3–5 cm in diameter with board yellow-green sub irregular lobes that extend 1–2 mm wide. The underside is dark brown to black with simple rhizines approximately 0.2-0.5 mm long.

Habitat and range 
Xanthoparmelia lecanorica is found in South Africa. At times specimens of Xanthoparmelia arida have been misidentified in North America as Xanthoparmelia lecanorica.

Chemistry 
Xanthoparmelia lecanorica has been recorded containing both lecanoric and usnic acids.

See also 
 List of Xanthoparmelia species

References 

lecanorica
Lichen species
Lichens of Africa
Lichens described in 1971
Taxa named by Mason Hale